Dragoslav S. Mitrinović (Serbian Cyrillic: Драгослав Митриновић; 23 June 1908 – 2 April 1995) was a Serbian mathematician known for his work in differential equations, functional equations, complex analysis.  He authored near 300 scientific journal papers and more than twelve books in his area.

Biography

Born in Smederevo, he studied in Pristina and Vranje, graduating in mathematics at the University of Belgrade Faculty of Philosophy (1932). He earned a Ph.D. (1933) on a study of differential equations entitled Istraživanja o jednoj važnoj diferencijalnoj jednačini prvog reda (that is, Investigations of an important differential equation of the first order), advised by  Mihailo Petrović.

He then worked as a secondary school teacher until 1946, when he visited University of Paris (1946) before joining the faculty at Skopje University in Macedonia where he founded the school of mathematics and two journals, eventually being  elected to the Macedonian Academy of Sciences and Arts.
He then worked for the University of Belgrade Faculty of Electrical Engineering (1951–78), where he also became head of the math department (1953) and the founder of the Belgrade School of Functional Equations, Differential Equations and Inequalities, as well the School of Mathematics (1960).  He also headed the math department at University of Niš (1965–75).

He was also affiliated with American Mathematical Society and Société Mathématique de France. He was among the founders of the Serbian Scientific Society,  the Mathematical documentation center of the Society of Mathematicians and Physicists of Serbia, the President of the Society of Mathematicians and Physicists of Macedonia, the President of the Commission for Mathematics of the Federal Council for the Coordination of Scientific Research.

References

Serbian mathematicians
Academic staff of the University of Belgrade
Academic staff of the University of Niš
1908 births
1995 deaths
University of Belgrade Faculty of Philosophy alumni
Academic staff of the Ss. Cyril and Methodius University of Skopje
Yugoslav mathematicians